The Gregory Highway is a state highway in Queensland, Australia that serves the major coal-mining centres of Central Queensland. The highway was named after Augustus Gregory, an early explorer.

Route description
The shorter southern section between Clermont and Springsure is designated the Gregory Highway. As of 2015, the first  between the Gulf Developmental Road via Einasleigh to the Lynd Junction are unsealed and may be corrugated. The next section to Charters Towers has been upgraded from single lane to mostly dual-laned bitumen. The road is used by many road trains.

Northern Australia Beef Roads upgrades
The Northern Australia Beef Roads Program announced in 2016 included the following project for the Gregory Developmental Road.

Road widening
The project to widen the road south of Charters Towers is expected to be completed in early 2023 at a total cost of $5.79 million.

Roads of Strategic Importance upgrades
The Roads of Strategic Importance initiative, last updated in March 2022, includes the following projects for the Gregory Highway.

Corridor upgrade
A lead project to upgrade the Townsville to Roma corridor, including sections of the Carnarvon, Dawson and Gregory Highways and surrounding state and council roads, at an estimated cost of $125 million, commenced construction of some work projects in 2020. Planning continues for other projects.

Intersection upgrade Capricorn Highway
This project was targeted for "early works" by the Queensland Government.

Pavement strengthening and widening
A project to strengthen and widen sections of pavement on the Gregory Developmental Road between Charters Towers and The Lynd at a cost of $15.3 million is planned to be completed in mid-2023. This project is targeted for "early works" by the Queensland Government.

Other upgrades
A project to widen and strengthen  of pavement between Marble Creek and Christmas Creek, at a cost of $45.41 million, was due to be completed in late 2023.

A project to upgrade a culvert near Porphyry Road, at a cost of $5,1 million, was due to be completed in late 2023.

Proposals
This would involve significant upgrades to the Gregory Highway between Charters Towers and Springsure.

List of towns along the Gregory Developmental Road/Highway
 Mount Surprise
 Einasleigh
 Charters Towers
 Belyando
 Clermont

 Capella
 Emerald
 Springsure

Major intersections

See also

 Highways in Australia
 List of highways in Queensland

References

Highways in Queensland